Forsen is a Swedish video game player and live streamer.

Forsen may also refer to:

 Forsen (surname)

See also
Forsån (Swedish: "little rapids") a stream in southern Stockholm, Sweden also known as Stortorpsån and Forsen
Storforsen (Swedish "the great rapids") in Sweden
Styggforsen, Stygg Rapids, a waterfall and a nature reserve in Dalarna County
Limedsforsen, a locality situated in Malung-Sälen Municipality, Dalarna County, Sweden